Jars is a commune in the Cher department in the Centre-Val de Loire region of France.

Geography

Population

Sights

 The church of St. Aignan, dating from the fifteenth century.
 Traces of the castle of Nancray.
 An eighteenth-century house, the "Tisserands" and mill at the hamlet of Plansons-d'en-Bas.
 A fifteenth-century manorhouse with twin towers from an old gateway.

See also
Communes of the Cher department

References

External links

Official website of the commune 

Communes of Cher (department)